This is a list of Finnish Elite Ice Hockey League seasons since inception of the Liiga and also of its predecessor, the SM-sarja:

SM-sarja years
1927–28 |
1928–29 |
1929–30 (cancelled) |
1930–31 |
1931–32 |
1932–33 |
1933-34 |
1934–35 |
1935–36 |
1936–37 |
1937–38 |
1938–39 |
1939–40 (did not take place) |
1940–41 |
1941–42 (cancelled)|
1942–43 |
1943–44 (stopped)|
1944–45 |
1945–46 |
1946–47 |
1947–48 |
1948–49 |
1949–50 |
1950–51 |
1951–52 |
1952–53 |
1953–54 |
1954–55 |
1955–56 |
1956–57 |
1957–58 |
1958–59 |
1959–60 |
1960–61 |
1961–62 |
1962–63 |
1963–64 |
1964–65 |
1965–66 |
1966–67 |
1967–68 |
1968–69 |
1969–70 |
1970–71 |
1971–72 |
1972–73 |
1973–74 |
1974–75

SM-liiga years
1975–76 |
1976–77 |
1977–78 |
1978–79 |
1979–80 |
1980–81 |
1981–82 |
1982–83 |
1983–84 |
1984–85 |
1985–86 |
1986–87 |
1987–88 |
1988–89 |
1989–90 |
1990–91 |
1991–92 |
1992–93 |
1993–94 |
1994–95 |
1995–96 |
1996–97 |
1997–98 |
1998–99 |
1999–2000 |
2000–01 |
2001–02 |
2002–03 |
2003–04 |
2004–05 |
2005–06 |
2006–07 |
2007–08 |
2008–09 |
2009–10 |
2010–11 |
2011–12 |
2012–13

Liiga years
2013–14 | 2014–15 | 2015–16 | 2016–17 | 2017–18 | 2018–19 | 2019–20 | 2020–21 | 2021–22 |

See also
Liiga
List of Finnish ice hockey champions
Mestis